Zhang Yiyi (born January 1, 1981) is a Chinese novelist and reviewer, who is famous for his hyping talent. He had once been selected as top 10 fools in China by Chinese netizens.

Biography
Zhang was born in 1981 in Xiangyin County, Yueyang City, Hunan Province.

In 2005, Zhang's novel I'm Not A Scum was published.

In 2011, Zhang published his novels Anti Dream of the Red Chamber and The Lovely Chinese.

In 2012, Zhang wrote the book Seeing Countrymen with Three Eyes.

In 2013, Zhang wrote a Fu The Chinese Communist Party to celebrate the 92nd anniversary of the Chinese Communist Party.

Works

References

1981 births
People from Xiangyin County
Writers from Hunan
Living people